Pierre-Julien Deloche (born 6 February 1982) is a French athlete who competes in compound archery. He has won medals at the Indoor World Championships, two gold medals at the 2013 World Cup Final, and became the world number one ranked archer in October 2013.

References

External links

 

1982 births
Living people
French male archers
World Archery Championships medalists
World Games silver medalists
Competitors at the 2013 World Games
European Games competitors for France
Archers at the 2019 European Games
World Games medalists in archery